Venkatapalem is a neighbourhood and a part of Urban Notified Area of Amaravati, the state capital of the Indian state of Andhra Pradesh. It was a village in Thullur mandal of Guntur district, prior to its denotification as gram panchayat.

Transport 
Venkatapalem to connected by a road to Amaravathi-Vijayawada road. State runs APS RTC busses on this road very frequently.

References

Neighbourhoods in Amaravati